Filippo Gagliardi (born c. 1606, died 1659) was an Italian painter of the Baroque period, active mainly in Rome. He collaborated with Filippo Lauri,  Andrea Sacchi and Giovanni Benedetto Castiglione. He also helped in the renovation of San Martino ai Monti (1647–54). He contributed illustrated architectural perspectives to Ferrari's Hesperides (1646). He was a member of the Accademia di San Luca from at least 1638 and became principe in 1656–58. He was also a member of the Congregazione dei Virtuosi del Pantheon. He produced numerous architectural paintings showing grand structures in strong chiaroscuro, including a set of four in the Palazzo Rospigliosi-Pallavicini in Rome, with figure by the Genoese painter Giovanni Benedetto Castiglione, and two in the Musée de Peinture e de Sculpture, Grenoble (inv. MG767, 768). He was also known as 'Filippo delle Prospettive'. His works are sometimes confused with those by Viviano Codazzi. He also appears to confused with Giovanni Francesco Gagliardi.

References

The Decoration of San Martino ai Monti - I, by Ann B. Sutherland. Burlington Magazine (1964); pages 58–67+69.
David R. Marshall, Viviano and Niccolò Codazzi and the Baroque Architectural Fantasy, Rome: Jandi Sapi, 1993, pages 519–555 with a catalogue of paintings.

1659 deaths
17th-century Italian painters
Italian male painters
Italian Baroque painters
Year of birth unknown